"Jaleo" is a song by American singer Nicky Jam and American producer Steve Aoki, it was released on October 5, 2018 via Sony Latin, The single written by Nicky Jam, Steve Aoki, Carlos Jim Vrolijk, Juan Diego Medina Vélez, Memru Renjaan, Mike Gazzo and produced by Steve Aoki.

Background
Nicky and Steve commented each other, Steve said: “So excited about dropping Jaleo with my brother Nicky Jam. This record was so fun to make and I’m so happy to share it with the world!!

And Nicky said: “Jaleo is a song that we recorded so that our fans from all over can enjoy. Its been an honor to collaborate with Steve, whom I thank for producing the song that has us so pumped to release!!  We are ready to form a “Jaleo” (rucus)!!

Composition
The song is a combination of invigorating latin rhythms and electronic beats.

Music video
The music video was released on October 5, 2018, directed by Jessy Terrero. The video was filmed in Miami, showed the stimulating pool party with beautiful ladies having fun under the sun.

Charts

Weekly charts

Year-end charts

References

2018 songs
2018 singles
Nicky Jam songs
Steve Aoki songs
Songs written by Nicky Jam
Songs written by Steve Aoki